is a Prefectural Natural Park in Kanagawa Prefecture, Japan. Established in 1960, the park lies wholly within the municipality of Yugawara.

See also
 National Parks of Japan

References

External links
  Map of Okuyugawara Prefectural Natural Park

Parks and gardens in Kanagawa Prefecture
Protected areas established in 1960
1960 establishments in Japan
Yugawara, Kanagawa